Paul Ainslie (born February 4, 1967) is a city councillor in Toronto, Ontario, Canada. In 2006, he was appointed as an interim councillor in ward 41, and was then elected as the councillor for Ward 43 in Scarborough East. On October 22, 2018 he was elected as Councillor for  Ward 24 Scarborough-Guildwood.

On February 1, 2006, City Council appointed Ainslie to fill the vacancy in Ward 41 that was created when Bas Balkissoon was elected in a provincial by-election in the riding of Scarborough—Rouge River.

A condition of the appointment was that he would not run as a candidate in the 2006 election. However, when councillor David Soknacki announced his intention not to run in Ward 43, Ainslie put his name forward as a candidate to replace him. Ainslie used to be an executive assistant to Soknacki. Soknacki supported Ainslie's candidacy.

During the election campaign in 2006, a video surfaced which showed Ainslie promising to Toronto City Council not to run. "I will not run in Ward 41, or any other ward in the city." His campaign literature urged voters to "return" him to city hall. He said that his campaign team suggested using the word "re-elect". Ainslie said, "I didn't think it was proper." Despite the controversy, he was elected in Ward 43.

In April 2007, he determined that it costs $20,000 annually to provide councillors and staff at City Hall offices with free coffee every day. He moved a motion in committee to remove the expense, but it failed to pass.

During the Rob Ford drug allegation scandal, Ainslie was removed as chair from the city's government management committee and appointed as chair of the parks and environment committee. On October 11, 2013, he resigned from the mayor's executive committee and his role as chair of the parks and environment committee over differences with Ford's longterm strategic direction for the city.

On May 3, 2013, Ainslie was stopped by a RIDE check on Kingston Road and was given a three-day licence suspension.

Election results

References

External links
 
 
 Paul Ainslie's Twitter
 Paul Ainslie's Instagram
 Paul Ainslie's Facebook

1967 births
Living people
Toronto city councillors
People from Scarborough, Toronto